DJ-Kicks: DJ Cam is a DJ mix album, mixed by DJ Cam. It was released on 18 November 1997 on the Studio !K7 independent record label as part of the DJ-Kicks series.

Track listing
 "Dieu Reconnaitra Les Siens" - DJ Cam
 "Zero G" - Minus 8
 "Dark Jazz" (DJ Cam Remix) - Daphreephunkateerz
 "Prelude to Cycle 6" - Part 2
 "Tell the World" - Sci-Fi Select
 "Ride Away" - The Mighty Bop
 "Gettin' Down Again" - Tek 9
 "Things in Time" - Rodney P
 "Freestyle 1" - Awesome Two + Channel Live
 "Unassisted" - Rasco
 "Freestyle 2" - Awesome Two + Jem
 "The Visitor" - Grand
 "Juggling" - The Ragga Twins
 "Milan" - Tommy Hools
 "Bronx Theme" (DJ Kicks) - DJ Cam

References

External links 
DJ-Kicks website

Dj Cam
1997 compilation albums